Gosar is a surname of Slovenian origin. Notable people with the surname include:

 Andrej Gosar (1887–1970), Slovenian and Yugoslav politician, economist and sociologist
 Paul Gosar (born 1958), American politician and dentist, U.S. representative from Arizona
 Pete Gosar (born 1967), American politician and aviator, candidate for Governor of Wyoming and past chair of the Wyoming Democratic Party; brother of Paul

See also
 
 Gozar, Iran, a village
 Gazdar, Iran, a village also known as Gozar
 Gozer, the supernatural villain of the film Ghostbusters

Slovene-language surnames